Mary Bowie may refer to:

 Mary Jane Bowie (born 1948), Canadian luger
 Mary Beth Bowie (born 1978), Canadian footballer